20000 Varuna, provisional designation , is a large trans-Neptunian object in the Kuiper belt. It was discovered in November 2000 by American astronomer Robert McMillan during a Spacewatch survey at the Kitt Peak National Observatory. It is named after the Hindu deity Varuna, one of the oldest deities mentioned in the Vedic texts.

Varuna's light curve is compatible with the body being a Jacobi ellipsoid, suggesting that it has an elongated shape due to its rapid rotation. Varuna's surface is moderately red in color due to the presence of complex organic compounds on its surface. Water ice is also present on its surface, and is thought to have been exposed by past collisions which may have also caused Varuna's rapid rotation. Although no natural satellites have been found or directly imaged around Varuna, analysis of variations in its light curve in 2019 suggests the presence of a possible satellite orbiting closely around Varuna.

History

Discovery 

Varuna was discovered by American astronomer Robert McMillan using the Spacewatch 0.9-meter telescope during a routine survey on 28 November 2000. The Spacewatch survey was conducted by McMillan at the Kitt Peak National Observatory near Tucson, Arizona. At the time of discovery, Varuna was located at a moderately dense star field close to the northern galactic equator. Although Varuna was not detected by McMillan's real-time computer software, he was able to identify Varuna moving slowly among the background stars by manually comparing multiple scans of the same region using the blinking technique. After McMillan's observing shift, follow-up observations of Varuna were conducted by astronomer Jeffrey Larsen in order to confirm the object. By the end of Larsen's observing shift, both McMillan and Larsen had made a total of 12 observations that spanned three nights.

The discovery of Varuna was formally announced in a Minor Planet Electronic Circular on 1 December 2000. It was given the provisional designation , indicating that it was discovered during the second half of November 2000. Varuna was the 2667th object observed in the latter half of November, as indicated by the last letter and numbers in its provisional designation. At the time, Varuna was thought to be one of the largest and brightest minor planets in the Solar System due to its relatively high apparent magnitude of 20 for a distant object, which implied that it might be around one-fourth the size of Pluto and comparable in size to the dwarf planet .

Subsequently, after the announcement of Varuna's discovery, precovery images of Varuna were found by German astronomers Andre Knofel and Reiner Stoss at the Palomar Observatory. One particular precovery image, which was taken with the Palomar Observatory's Big Schmidt telescope in 1955, showed that Varuna was located three degrees away from its extrapolated location based on the approximate circular orbit determined in December 2000. The oldest known precovery image of Varuna was taken on 24 November 1954. These precovery images along with additional observations from Japan, Hawaii, and Arizona helped astronomers refine its orbit and determine Varuna's proper classification.

In January 2001, Varuna was assigned the minor planet number 20000 by the Minor Planet Center as its orbit was well determined from precovery images and subsequent observations. The minor planet number 20000 was particularly chosen to commemorate Varuna's large size, being the largest classical Kuiper belt object known at that time and was believed to be as large as Ceres. The number 20000 was also chosen to commemorate the coincidental 200th anniversary of the discovery of Ceres, which occurred in the same month as the numbering of Varuna.

Name 
Varuna is named after the eponymous Hindu deity Varuna, following the International Astronomical Union naming convention for non-resonant Kuiper belt objects after creator deities. The name was proposed by Indian choreographer Mrinalini Sarabhai, and was approved by the IAU in March 2001. Varuna is one of the oldest Vedic deities of Hindu literature, being mentioned in the earliest hymns of the Rigveda. In Hindu literature, Varuna created and presided over the waters of the heaven and of the ocean. Varuna is the king of gods and men and the universe, and has unlimited knowledge.

Planetary symbols are no longer much used in astronomy, so Varuna never received a symbol in the astronomical literature. There is no standard symbol for Varuna used by astrologers either. Denis Moskowitz, a software engineer in Massachusetts who designed the symbols for most of the dwarf planets, proposed a symbol for Varuna: it derives from the Devanagari letter va व and Varuna's snake-lasso.

Orbit and classification 

Its orbit is nearly circular, with a low orbital eccentricity of 0.056. Due to its low orbital eccentricity, its distance from the Sun varies slightly over the course of its orbit. Varuna's minimum distance possible (MOID) from Neptune is 12.04 AU. Over the course of its orbit, Varuna's distance from the Sun ranges from 40.3 AU at perihelion (closest distance) to 45.1 AU at aphelion (farthest distance). Varuna's orbit is inclined to the ecliptic by 17 degrees, similar to Pluto's orbital inclination. Varuna had passed its perihelion in 1928 and is currently moving away from the Sun, approaching aphelion by 2071.

With a nearly circular orbit at around 40 to 50 AU, Varuna is classified as a classical Kuiper belt object (KBO). Varuna's semi-major axis of 42.8 AU is similar to that of other large classical KBOs such as Quaoar (a=43.7 AU) and Makemake (a=45.6 AU), although other orbital characteristics such as inclination widely differ. Varuna is a member of the "dynamically hot" class of classical KBOs, meaning that it has an orbital inclination greater than 4 degrees, the imposed maximum inclination for dynamically cold members of its population. As a classical KBO, Varuna is not in orbital resonance with Neptune and is also free from any significant perturbation by Neptune.

Rotation 

Varuna has a rapid rotation period of approximately 6.34 hours, derived from a double-peaked solution for Varuna's rotational light curve. Varuna's rotation was first measured January 2001 by astronomer Tony Farnham using the McDonald Observatory's 2.1-meter telescope, as part of a study on the rotation and colors of distant objects. CCD photometry of Varuna's light curve in 2001 revealed that it displays large brightness variations with an amplitude of about 0.5 magnitudes. The measured rotational light curve of Varuna provided two ambiguous rotation periods of 3.17 and 6.34 hours, for a single-peaked and a double-peaked solution, respectively. Additional possible rotation periods of 2.79 and 3.66 hours were also obtained by Farnham, although these values could not be ruled out at the time.

A single-peaked interpretation of Varuna's rotational light curve (3.17 h) would assume a spherical shape for Varuna, with albedo features on its surface that would account for its brightness variations. A double-peaked interpretation of Varuna's rotational light curve (6.34 h) would assume that Varuna's shape is an elongated ellipsoid, with an estimated a/b aspect ratio of 1.5–1.6. The rotational light curve of Varuna was later investigated by astronomers David Jewitt and Scott Sheppard during February and April 2001, and concluded that the double-peaked interpretation for Varuna's light curve is the most plausible solution due to the absence of rotational variation in Varuna's color in the visible spectrum.

Examination of past photometric observations of Varuna's light curve has shown that its light curve amplitude had increased by roughly 0.13 magnitudes from 2001 to 2019. This increase in amplitude is due to the combined effects of Varuna's ellipsoidal shape, rotation, and varying phase angle. Geometric models for Varuna's changing amplitude have provided several possible solutions for the orientation of Varuna's rotational poles in ecliptic coordinates, with the best-fit solution adopting a spin axis right ascension and declination of 54° and −65°, respectively. The best-fit pole orientation of Varuna implies that it is being viewed at a near-edge on configuration, in which Varuna's equator nearly faces directly toward Earth.

Varuna's rapid rotation is believed to have resulted from disruptive collisions that have sped up its rotation during the formation of the Solar System. The present collision rate in the trans-Neptunian region is minimal, though collisions were more frequent during the formation of the Solar System. However, Jewitt and Sheppard calculated that the rate of disruptive collisions among large trans-Neptunian objects (TNOs) during the Solar System's formation is extremely uncommon, contradictory to the current abundance of binary and rapidly rotating TNOs that are believed to have originated from such collisions. To explain the abundance of binary and rapidly rotating TNOs, the rate of collisions among TNOs had likely increased as a result of Neptune's outward migration perturbing the orbits of TNOs, thus increasing the frequency of collisions which may have led to Varuna's rapid rotation.

Physical characteristics

Size and shape 

As a result of its rapid rotation, the shape of Varuna is deformed into a triaxial ellipsoid. Given the rapid rotation, rare for objects so large, Varuna's shape is described as a Jacobi ellipsoid, with an a/b aspect ratio of around 1.5–1.6 (in which Varuna's longest semi-axis a is 1.5–1.6 times longer than its b semi-axis). Examination of Varuna's light curve has found that the best-fit model for Varuna's shape is a triaxial ellipsoid with the semi-axes a, b, and c in ratios in the range of b/a = 0.63–0.80, and c/a = 0.45–0.52.

Most diameter estimates for Varuna were determined by measuring its thermal emission, although size estimates have been constrained to smaller values as a result of higher albedos determined by space-based thermal measurements. Observations of stellar occultations by Varuna have also provided varying size estimates.

Since the discovery of Varuna, another larger rapidly rotating (3.9 h) object over twice the size of Varuna, has been discovered and is also thought to have an elongated shape, albeit slightly less pronounced (estimated ratios of b/a = 0.76~0.88, and c/a = 0.50~0.55, possibly due to a higher estimated density approximately ).

Unlikely to be a dwarf planet 

Astronomer Gonzalo Tancredi considered Varuna likely to be a dwarf planet and a Jacobi ellipsoid in shape. Despite this, they assumed Varuna was in hydrostatic equilibrium for their calculations. While the larger objects in this range, such as Varuna, may have fully collapsed into solid material in their interiors, their surfaces likely remain uncompressed. That is, they would not be in hydrostatic equilibrium and not dwarf planets.

Thermal measurements 

The discrepancy between ground-based and space-based size estimates are due to the limited observable wavelengths for ground-based observations, as a result of absorption of Earth's atmosphere. Distant trans-Neptunian objects such as Varuna intrinsically emit thermal radiation at longer wavelengths due to their low temperatures. However, at long wavelengths, thermal radiation cannot pass through Earth's atmosphere and ground-based observations could only measure weak thermal emissions from Varuna at near-infrared and submillimeter wavelengths, hindering the accuracy of ground-based thermal measurements.

Space-based observations provided more accurate thermal measurements as they are able to measure thermal emissions at a broad range of wavelengths that are normally interfered by Earth's atmosphere.

Occultations 

Previous attempted observations of stellar occultations by Varuna in 2005 and 2008 were unsuccessful due to uncertainties in Varuna's proper motion along with undesirable conditions for observing. In 2010, an occultation by Varuna was successfully observed by a team of astronomers led by Bruno Sicardy on the night of 19 February. The occultation was observed from various regions in southern Africa and north-eastern Brazil. Although observations of the occultation from South Africa and Namibia had negative results, observations from Brazil, particularly at São Luís in Maranhão, successfully detected a  occultation by Varuna of an 11.1 magnitude star. Because the occultation occurred near Varuna's maximum brightness, the occultation was observing the maximum apparent surface area for an ellipsoidal shape; the longest axis of Varuna's shape was observed during the occultation. São Luís was also located very close to the predicted centerline of Varuna's shadow path, meaning the chord length was close to the longest measurable during the event, closely constraining the possible maximum equatorial diameter.

The resulting lower bound on Varuna's polar dimension is approximately equal to Lacerda and Jewitt's lower bound c/a aspect ratio of 0.45, which they previously calculated in 2007. A preliminary conference presentation, given before the Camalaú results were fully analyzed, concluded that the São Luís and Quixadá results together suggested a significantly elongated shape is required for Varuna.

While the apparent oblateness of Varuna could not be determined from the single chord obtained from the 2014 occultation, the 2013 occultation yielded two chords, corresponding to an apparent oblateness of approximately 0.29.

Spectra and surface 

Varuna's spectrum was first analyzed in early 2001 with the Near Infrared Camera Spectrometer (NICS) at the Galileo National Telescope in Spain. Spectral observations of Varuna at near-infrared wavelengths revealed that the surface of Varuna is moderately red and displays a red spectral slope between the wavelength range of 0.9 and 1.8 μm. Varuna's spectrum also exhibits strong absorption bands at wavelengths of 1.5 and 2 μm, indicating the presence of water ice on its surface.

The red color of Varuna's surface results from the photolysis of organic compounds being irradiated by sunlight and cosmic rays. The irradiation of organic compounds such as methane on Varuna's surface produces tholins, which are known to reduce its surface reflectivity (albedo) and are expected to cause its spectrum to appear featureless. The fresh appearance of Varuna's surface may have resulted from collisions that have exposed fresh water ice beneath Varuna's layer of tholins above its surface.

Another study of Varuna's spectra at near-infrared wavelengths in 2008 yielded a featureless spectrum with a blue spectral slope, contrary to earlier results in 2001. The spectra obtained in 2008 showed no clear indication of water ice, contradictory to the 2001 results. The discrepancy between the two results was interpreted as an indication of surface variation on Varuna, though this possibility was later ruled out by a 2014 study of Varuna's spectra. The 2014 results closely matched the previous spectra obtained in 2001, implying that the featureless spectra obtained in 2008 is likely erroneous.

Models for Varuna's spectrum suggest that its surface is most likely formed of a mixture of amorphous silicates (25%), complex organic compounds (35%), amorphous carbon (15%) and water ice (25%), with a possibility of up to 10% methane ice. For an object with a size similar to Varuna, the presence of volatile methane could not be primordial as Varuna is not massive enough to retain volatiles on its surface. An event that had occurred subsequently after Varuna's formation–such as an energetic impact–would likely account for the presence of methane on Varuna's surface. Additional near-infrared observations of Varuna's spectra were conducted at the NASA Infrared Telescope Facility in 2017 and have identified absorption features between 2.2 and 2.5 μm that might be associated with ethane and ethylene, based on preliminary analysis. For mid-sized bodies such as Varuna, volatiles such as ethane and ethylene are more likely to be retained than lighter volatiles such as methane according to volatile retention theories formulated by astronomers Schaller and Brown in 2007.

Brightness 

Varuna's apparent magnitude, its brightness as seen from Earth, varies from 19.5 to 20 magnitudes. At opposition, its apparent magnitude can reach up 20.3 magnitudes. Combined thermal measurements from the Spitzer Space Telescope and the Herschel Space Observatory in 2013 obtained a visual absolute magnitude (HV) of 3.76, comparable to that of the similarly-sized Kuiper belt object  (HV=3.83). Varuna is among the twenty brightest trans-Neptunian objects known, despite the Minor Planet Center assuming an absolute magnitude of 3.6.

The surface of Varuna is dark, with a measured geometric albedo of 0.127 based on thermal observations in 2013. Varuna's geometric albedo is similar to that of the possible dwarf planet , which has a geometric albedo of 0.109. Varuna was initially thought to have a much lower geometric albedo, as early ground observations of Varuna's thermal emissions from 2000 to 2005 estimated albedo values ranging from 0.04 to 0.07, around eight times darker than Pluto's albedo. Later thermal measurements of Varuna with space-based telescopes refuted these previous albedo measurements: Spitzer measured a higher geometric albedo of 0.116 while further thermal measurements from Spitzer and Herschel in 2013 estimated a geometric albedo of 0.127.

Photometric observations of Varuna in 2004 and 2005 were carried out to observe changes in Varuna's light curve caused by opposition surges when the phase angle of Varuna approaches zero degrees at opposition. The photometry results showed that Varuna's light curve amplitude had decreased to 0.2 magnitudes at opposition, less than its overall amplitude of 0.42 magnitudes. The photometry results also showed an increase in asymmetry of Varuna's light curve near opposition, indicating variations of scattering properties over its surface. The opposition surge of Varuna differs from those of dark asteroids, which gradually becomes more pronounced near opposition in contrast to Varuna's narrow opposition surge, in which its light curve amplitude sharply changes within a phase angle of 0.5 degrees. The opposition surges of other Solar System bodies with moderate albedos behave similarly to Varuna, indirectly suggesting that Varuna might have a higher albedo in contrast to ground-based albedo estimates. This implication of a higher albedo for Varuna was confirmed in subsequent thermal measurements from Spitzer and Herschel.

Internal structure 
Varuna's low bulk density is likely due to a porous internal structure composed of a nearly proportional ratio of water ice and rock. To explain its porous internal structure and composition, Lacerda and Jewitt suggested that Varuna may have a granular internal structure. Varuna's granular internal structure is thought to have resulted from fractures caused by past collisions likely responsible for its rapid rotation. Other objects including Saturn's moons Tethys and Iapetus are also known to have a similarly low density, with a porous internal structure and a composition that is predominantly water ice and rock. The internal structures of low-density TNOs, such as Varuna, had only partially differentiated, as their likely rocky interiors had not reached sufficient temperatures to melt and collapse into pore spaces since formation. As a result, most mid-sized TNOs had remained internally porous, thus resulting in low densities. In this case, Varuna may not be in hydrostatic equilibrium.

Possible satellite 

Photometric observations of Varuna's light curve, led by Valenzuela and colleagues in 2019, indicate that a possible satellite might be orbiting Varuna at a close distance. By using the Fourier analysis method of combining four separate light curves obtained in 2019, they derived a lower quality light curve amplitude with a greater amount of residuals. Their result indicated that Varuna's light curve experiences subtle changes over time. They plotted the residuals of the combined light curve in a Lomb periodogram and derived an orbital period of 11.9819 hours for the possible satellite. The satellite varies in brightness by 0.04 magnitudes as it orbits Varuna. Due to the satellite's close proximity to Varuna, it is not yet possible to resolve it with space-based telescopes such as the Hubble Space Telescope as the angular distance between Varuna and the satellite is smaller than the resolution of current space-based telescopes. Although direct observations of Varuna's satellite are unfeasible with current telescopes, Varuna's equator is being directly viewed at an edge-on configuration, implying that mutual events between the satellite and Varuna could possibly occur in the future.

Exploration 
Planetary scientist Amanda Zangari calculated that a flyby mission to Varuna could take just over 12 years using a Jupiter gravity assist, based on a launch date of 2035 or 2038. Alternative trajectories using gravity assists from Jupiter, Saturn, or Uranus have been also considered. A trajectory using gravity assists from Jupiter and Uranus could take just over 13 years, based a launch date of 2034 or 2037, whereas a trajectory using gravity assists from Saturn and Uranus could take under 18 years, based on an earlier launch date of 2025 or 2029. Varuna would be approximately 45 AU from the Sun when the spacecraft arrives before 2050, regardless of the trajectories used.

Notes

References

External links 
 
 (20000) Varuna – Large TNO precovered on several old plates Precovery images of Varuna. Retrieved 22 September 2019.
 Beyond Jupiter: The World of Distant Minor Planets – (20000) Varuna
 

Classical Kuiper belt objects
Discoveries by the Spacewatch project
Varuna
Possible dwarf planets
Objects observed by stellar occultation
20001128